This article concerns the period 799 BC – 790 BC.

Events and trends
799 BC— According to the Vayu Purana, the Pradyota dynasty conquers Magadha, starting a rule that lasts 138 years.
797 BC— Thespieus, Archon of Athens, dies after a reign of 27 years and is succeeded by his son Agamestor.
796 BC— Adad-Nirari III captures Damascus after a siege against King Ben-Hadad III.
c.790 BC— Adad-Nirari III conducts a raid against the Chaldeans.

Significant people
Hazael, King of Aramaean Damascus, r. 842–796 BC
Pygmalion, Legendary King (formerly joint ruler with his sister, Dido) of Tyre, r. 831–785 BC
Shoshenq III, Pharaoh of Egypt (Twenty-Second Dynasty), r. 837–798 BC, died in 798 BC
Jehoash of Judah, King of Judah, r. c.836–797 BC
Xuan, King of Zhou dynasty China, r. 827–782 BC
Thespieus, Archon of Athens, in office 824–797 BC
Jehoahaz, King of Israel, r. c.814–798 BC
Dido, Legendary Queen (and founder) of Carthage, r. 814–c.760 BC
Adad-Nirari III, King of Assyria, r. 811–783 BC
Utupurshi, King of Diauehi, r. 810 BC–770 BC
Menuas, King of Urartu, r. 810–785
Caranus, King of Macedon, r. 808–778 BC
Shoshenq VI, Pharaoh of Egypt (Twenty-Third Dynasty), r. 801–795 BC
Agesilaus I, Archilaus (Agiad Kings, r. 820–790 BC and 790–760 BC respectively) and Eunomus (Eurypontid King r. 800–780 BC), Co-Kings of Sparta
Lycurgus of Sparta (800 BC?–730 BC?), legendary lawgiver 
Ninurta-apla-X (full name unknown), King of Babylon, r. c.800–790 BC
Jehoash of Israel, King of Israel, r. c.798–782 BC
Shoshenq IV, Pharaoh of Egypt (Twenty-Second Dynasty), r. 798–785 BC
Amaziah, King of Judah, r. c.797–768 BC
Agamestor, Archon of Athens, in office 797–778 BC
Ben-Hadad III, King of Aramaean Damascus, r. c.796–792 BC
Osorkon III, Pharaoh of Egypt (Twenty-Third Dynasty), r. 795–767 BC
Alara, King of Kush, r. 795 – c.765 BC
Rezin, King of Aramaean Damascus, r. 792-732 BC
Marduk-bel-zeri, King of Babylon, r. c.790–780 BC 
Homer of Chios, Legendary Greek Poet
Jeroboam, Israelite Prince, regent, and future king

Contemporaries of future importance
Jonah of Israel, future prophet (according to Bible)
Amos of Israel, future prophet and author of the Book of Amos (according to Bible)

References

 

es:Años 790 a. C.